Ellen Nisbeth (born 1987) is a Swedish violist. She performed on Britta Byström’s CD, “Invisible Cities” and on Ensemble Ernst’s CD, “...BUT...” As part of the European Concert Hall Organisation's "Rising Star" program, Nisbeth performed "Tales Of Lost Times" for solo viola by Katarina Leyman and other works by Kaija Saariaho at 
Elbphilharmonie Concert Hall in January 2018.

Career
Ellen Nisbeth studied viola with Peter Herresthal at the Royal College of Music, Stockholm. She also studied at The Royal College of Music in London and the Norwegian Academy of Music. In 2015, Nisbeth was appointed Associate Professor of Music at the University of Stavanger in Norway. Nisbeth also teaches at Edsberg Castle and the Royal College of Music, Stockholm. Regularly giving masterclasses and performing around the world, Nisbeth has achieved a well known status as a violist. She performs on a Dom Nicolo Amati viola from 1714.

Discography

...BUT... (2012)
Invisible Cities (2014)
Let Beauty Awake (2017)

Awards

Swedish Soloist Prize (2013)
Nordic Soloist Prize (2013)

References

1987 births
Living people
Swedish classical violists
Women violists
Musicians from Uppsala
Academic staff of the Royal College of Music, Stockholm
Swedish women musicians
Swedish violists
21st-century women musicians
21st-century Swedish musicians
21st-century violists